The pewees are a genus, Contopus, of small to medium-sized insect-eating birds in the Tyrant flycatcher family Tyrannidae.

These birds are known as pewees, from the call of one of the more common members of this vocal group. They are generally charcoal-grey birds with wing bars that live in wooded areas.

The genus Contopus was introduced by the German ornithologist Jean Cabanis in 1855 with the eastern wood pewee as the type species. The name of the genus combines the Ancient Greek words kontos  "pole" or "shaft" and pous "foot".

The genus contains 16 species:

References

External links

 
Taxa named by Jean Cabanis